Corylus avellana, the common hazel, is a species of flowering plant in the birch family Betulaceae. It is native to Europe and western Asia. It is an important component of the hedgerows that were the traditional field boundaries in lowland England. The wood was traditionally grown as coppice, the poles cut being used for wattle-and-daub building and agricultural fencing.

Common hazel is cultivated for its nuts. The name hazelnut applies to the nuts of any species in the genus Corylus,  but in commercial settings a hazelnut is usually that of C. avellana. This hazelnut or cob nut, the kernel of the seed, is edible and used raw or roasted, or ground into a paste. The cob is round, compared with the longer filbert nut.

Description

The flowers are produced very early in spring, before the leaves, and are monoecious with single-sex wind-pollinated catkins. The fruit is a nut, produced in clusters of one to five together, each nut held in a short leafy involucre ("husk") which encloses about three-quarters of the nut. The nut falls out of the involucre when ripe, about 7–8 months after pollination.

It is readily distinguished from the closely related filbert (Corylus maxima) by the short involucre; in the filbert the nut is fully enclosed by a beak-like involucre longer than the nut.

Taxonomy
The scientific name avellana derives from the town of Avella in Italy, and was selected by Linnaeus from Leonhart Fuchs's De historia stirpium commentarii insignes (1542), where the species was described as "Avellana nux sylvestris" ("wild nut of Avella").  That name was taken in turn from Pliny the Elder's first century A.D. encyclopedia Naturalis Historia.

Distribution
Corylus avellana occurs from the British Isles south to Iberia, Italy, Greece, Turkey and Cyprus, north to central Scandinavia, and east to the central Ural Mountains, the Caucasus, and northwestern Iran.

Ecology

The leaves provide food for many animals, including Lepidoptera such as the case-bearer moth Coleophora anatipennella. Caterpillars of the concealer moth Alabonia geoffrella have been found feeding inside dead common hazel twigs.

The fruit are possibly even more important animal food, both for invertebrates adapted to circumvent the shell (usually by ovipositing in the female flowers, which also gives protection to the offspring) and for vertebrates which manage to crack them open (such as squirrels and corvids). Both are considered pests by hazelnut growers.

Cultivation

There are many cultivars of the hazel, including Barcelona, Butler, Casina, Clark Cosford, Daviana, Delle Langhe, England, Ennis, Fillbert, Halls Giant, Jemtegaard, Kent Cob, Lewis, Tokolyi, Tonda Gentile, Tonda di Giffoni, Tonda Romana, Wanliss Pride, and Willamette. Some of these are grown for specific qualities of the nut including large nut size, and early and late fruiting cultivars, whereas other are grown as pollinators. The majority of commercial hazelnuts are propagated from root sprouts. Some cultivars are of hybrid origin between common hazel and filbert.

The following ornamental cultivars have gained the Royal Horticultural Society's Award of Garden Merit:-
'Contorta' (corkscrew hazel, Harry Lauder's walking stick)
'Red Majestic'

Uses

According to the New Sunset Western Garden Book, the European hazelnut is among the most widely grown hazelnut plants for commercial nut production.

This shrub is common in many European woodlands. It is an important component of the hedgerows that were the traditional field boundaries in lowland England. The wood was traditionally grown as coppice, the poles cut being used for wattle-and-daub building and agricultural fencing.

Hazelnuts 

Hazelnuts are rich in protein and unsaturated fat. They also contain significant amounts of manganese, copper, vitamin E, thiamine, and magnesium.

Common hazel is cultivated for its nuts in commercial orchards in Europe, Turkey, Iran and Caucasus. The name "hazelnut" applies to the nuts of any of the species of the genus Corylus. This hazelnut or cobnut, the kernel of the seed, is edible and used raw or roasted, or ground into a paste. The seed has a thin, dark brown skin which has a bitter flavour and is sometimes removed before cooking.  The top producer of hazelnuts, by a large margin, is Turkey, specifically the Giresun Province.  Turkish hazelnut production of 625,000 tonnes accounts for approximately 75% of worldwide production.

References

External links
 
 Corylus avellana - information, genetic conservation units and related resources. European Forest Genetic Resources Programme (EUFORGEN)

avellana
Flora of Europe
Flora of Western Asia
Flora of Russia
Trees of mild maritime climate
Plants described in 1753
Taxa named by Carl Linnaeus
Least concern plants
Garden plants of Asia
Garden plants of Europe